Henry Edgar Meek (8 October 1857 — 23 June 1920) was an English first-class cricketer and brewer.

The son of Alexander Meek, he was born at Devizes in October 1857. He was educated at Harrow School, where he was a noted sportsman who played for the cricket and football teams, in addition to winning the Public Schools' Rackets competition in 1876 with Lewis Jarvis. As a cricketer at Harrow, he was described by Wisden as "one of the hardest hitters ever turned out by Harrow, a good fast bowler and an excellent field at mid-off". A year after captaining the Harrow cricket team, Meek made a single first-class appearance for the Marylebone Cricket Club (MCC) against Sussex at Lord's in 1878. His only foray into first-class cricket ended in disappointment, with Meek being dismissed in the MCC's only innings for 0 by Richard Fillery. Away from sport, he was by profession a brewer and was President of the Devizes Chamber of Commerce in 1908. Meek died in Scotland in June 1920 at Gullane, East Lothian.

References

External links

1857 births
1920 deaths
People from Devizes
People educated at Harrow School
English cricketers
Marylebone Cricket Club cricketers
English brewers